List of surnames in Ukraine. This list is also to include surnames that did not originate in Ukraine as there are people living in the country with numerous ethnic backgrounds, and, therefore, surnames, from all over the Europe and Asia. It also serves as an indication in the English Wikipedia to potentially point out the articles on family names that may need to be created. If you or your relatives live in Ukraine, go ahead and add your surname to the list. Please list the surnames in alphabetical order, according to Ukrainian Cyrillic. Please add the Ukrainian Cyrillic spellings as well. This list needs to be periodically updated from the Ukrainian Wikipedia.

A 

 Abrahamovsky 
 Avksentiev (:uk:Авксентьєв)
 Avramenko 
 Adamchuk 
 Anhelyuk 
 Andreikiv 
 Andreiko 
 Andreichenko 
 Andreichyn 
 Andresyuk 
 Andriyenko 
 Andriychuk 
 Andrichuk 
 Androshchuk 
 Andruko 
 Andrusenko 
 Andrusyshyn 
 Andrusiv 
 Andrusyak 
 Andrukh 
 Andruntsiv 
 Andrushkiv 
 Andrushko 
 Andrushchenko 
 Anhelyuk 
 Antonenko 
 Antoniv 
 Artyuschenko 
 Arkhipenko

B (Б) 
 Babiak 
 Bakaj or Bakay or Bakai 
 Balanchuk 
 Barabash 
 Bezkorovainyi 
 Bernadyn 
 Bzovsky 
 Bilenko 
 Biletskyy or Biletskyi 
 Bilovol 
 Bilokhatniuk 
 Blyzniuk or Blyznyuk 
 Bohatenko 
 Bohomolets 
 Bohoslovskyi 
 Boyko 
 Bondar 
 Bondarenko 
 Bondarchuk 
 Boreckyi 
 Brutka 
 Bublyk 
 Bulavynets 
 Bulhakiv 
 Burgos

V (В) 
 Vasylyk 
 Vasylyshyn 
 Vasylchuk 
 Vashchenko 
 Veremchuk 
 Verminchuk 
 Vershyhora 
 Vyhovsky 
 Vynnychenko 
 Vilkul 
 Vovk 
 Voitenko 
 Voloshyn

H (Г) 
 Haburjak 
 Halyckyj 
 Halichenko 
 Haponenko , sometimes spells as Gaponenko due to Russification
 Haranchak 
 Harasemchuk \
 Hycha 
 Hleba 
 Hlib 
 Holovaty 
 Holub, sometimes spells as Golub due to Russification 
 Hordiyenko 
 Horenko 
 Hotopylo/Hotopіlo/Hotopyla/Hutopyla 
 Hryhorenko 
 Hryhorchuk 
 Hrytsenko , sometimes spells as Grytsenko due to Russification
 Hryshchuk , sometimes spells as Grischuk due to Russification
 Huba, sometimes spells as Guba due to Russification 
 Hubenko 
 Hulyahrotsky 
 Humeniuk 
 Gourari (гурари)

G (Ґ) 
 Gandzhalas 
 Gavrilchuk 
 Galey 
 Glushenko 
 Gogol 
 Goraya 
 Gryglevich 
 Gudzyak 
 Gulka 
 Gura 
 Gurka

D (Д) 
 Davydenko 
 Danilenko 
 Demchyshyn 
 Danylo 
 Demchuk 
 Derevyanko 
 Derkach 
 Dzyubenko 
 Dobryvechir 
 Dovzhenko 
 Doluda 
 Doroshenko 
 Doroshkin/Dorozhkin 
 Dudyk 
 Dudnyk 
 Dubec/Dubets 
(Dryga)

E (Е) 
 Evanishyn 
 Evashchuk 
 Elishchuk

Ye (Є) 
 Yevdokymenko 
 Yenkura Yankurev, Yankura Yevtukh 
 Yevtushenko 
 Yevtushok 
 Yehorenko 
 Yelenyuk 
 Yelyuk 
 Yeliashkevych

Zh (Ж) 
 Zherdev 
 Zherebetsky 
 Zherebny 
Zhynzher

Z (З) 
 Zavhorodniy 
 Zahara 
 Zbirak 
 Zvizdaryk 
 Zelenko 
 Zelensky 
 Zinchenko 
 Zinovenko 
 Zlenko 
 Zoshchenko 
 Zunchenko

I (І) 
 Ilnyckyj 
 Ishchenko 
 Ivanenko 
 Ivasiv 
 Ivashchenko

Yi (Ї) 
 Yiranek

Y (Й) 
 Yovenko

K (К) 
 Kalashnyk 
 Karashkevych 
 Karol 
 Karvatsky 
 Katyuk 
 Kvasnytsya 
 Kyva 
 Kyzyma 
 Kyrylenko 
 Klymenko 
 Klyuka 
 Kobevko 
 Kovalenko 
 Kovalchyk 
 Kovalchuk 
 Kozhukha 
 Kozachenko 
 Kozbur 
 Koziy 
 Kozoriz 
 Koltash 
 Koltyk 
 Kolba    
 Kolesnyk 
 Kondratyuk 
 Kopiika 
 Kondratsky 
 Kornatsky 
 Kornelyuk 
 Kostachuk 
 Kosh 
 Koshla 
 Koshulynsky 
 Kravchenko 
 Kravets 
 Kryvenko 
 Kryvobok 
 Kryvonis 
 Kryvoruchko 
 kryvohat'ko 
 Krylenko 
 Ktytor 
 Kudleychuk 
 Kulchytsky 
 Kupranets 
 Kurylenko 
 Kupriy 
 Kurivczak

L (Л) 
 Ladanchuk , 
 Lazarenko 
 Len 
 Leonchuk 
 Lyniv 
 Lytvynenko 
 Liski 
 Litovchenko 
 Loboda 
 Lukashenko 
 Lukyanenko 
 Lyakh 
 Lyashka

M (М) 
 Mayko 
 Makarenko 
 Malinovskyi 
 Mandychevsky 
 Maryniuk 
 Markovych 
 Marmurchuk 
 Marunchak 
 Maslak 
 Matviyenko 
 Meleshko 
 Melnyk 
 Merena 
 Mykytyuk 
 Minyaylyuk 
 Mykhaylyk 
 Miroshnychenko 
 Movchan 
 Moroz 
 Motryuk 
 Muzychuk 
 Musa 
 Mishura (surname) (Мішура)

N (Н) 
 Navolsky 
 Nahnybida 
 Nahorny 
 Nazarenko 
 Nazarovich 
 Nazarchuk 
 Nazdratenko 
 Nalyvaiko 
 Nalyvaichenko 
 Nepypyvo 
 Netudykhata 
 Nosenko 
Nesplick

O (О) 
 Oliynyk 
 Orlyk 
 Osipenko 
 Ostapets 
 Onopka 
 Ostapyuk

P (П) 
 Pavlyshyn 
 Pavlovsky 
 Pavlyuk 
 Pavlyuchenko 
 Palinchak 
 Pankiv 
 Panchak 
 Panchyk 
 Parkhomenko 
 Pelepchuk 
 Perevozchenko 
 Petraszczuk 
 Petrenko 
 Petrynets 
 Pymonenko 
 Pivtora 
 Pipenko 
 Pirozhenko 
 Plushenko, Plyushenko 
 Pohrebynsky 
 Pokotylo 
 Ponikarovsky 
 Popadynets 
 Poroshenko 
 Porkhovsky 
 Potchak 
 Prokup 
 Pshenyanyk 
 Pshyk

R (Р) 
 Rodchenko 
 Romanyshyn/Romanyszyn 
 Roshcha 
 Rudenko 
 Ryabets (uk: Рябець)

S (С) 
 Savaryn 
 Salenko 
 Sakhaidachny 
 Svystun 
 Svyshchuk 
 Serben 
 Semko 
 Silchenko 
 Skoropadskyi 
 Skoryk 
 Skotsyk 
 Skripachuk 
 Skripchenko 
 Skrobala 
 Smereka 
 Smeshko 
 Sokulsky 
 Solar 
 Soletsky 
 Stasiuk 
 Stesyshyn 
 Stetsko 
 Strembitsky 
 Suprunyuk

T (Т) 
 Tamke 
 Taras 
 Tarasenko 
 Taruta 
 Tereshchenko 
 Teterya 
 Tymko 
 Tymofichuk 
 Tymoshenko 
 Tymoshchuk 
 Tyshchenko (alternate spelling: Tyszczenko) 
 Tytovsky 
 Tytovych 
 Tovkachuk 
 Tomenko 
 Tomorug  
 Tryasylo 
 Turyn 
 Tyahnybok

U (У) 
 Udovenko 
 Udovychenko 
 Umanets 
 Usachenko 
 Usenko 
 Usyk 
 Ustenko 
 Ustymenko 
 Ustymovych 
 Ustyyanovych

F (Ф) 
 Farion   
 Fedirchuk 
 Fedorenko 
 Fedotenko 
 Fishchenko 
 Fomenko 
 Fochuk 
 Furon

Kh (Х) 
 Khachula 
 Khymnyuk 
 Khomin 
 Khomyuk 
 Khomiak

Ts (Ц) 
 Tsvyk 
 Tsvyhun 
 Tsypkin 
 Tsupko

Ch (Ч) 
 Chykatilo 
 Chovnyk 
 Chornovil

Sh (Ш) 
 Shastko 
 Shevchenko 
 Shevchuk 
 Shynkarchuk 
 Shmata

Shch (Щ) 
 Shchehelskiy 
 Shcherba 
 Shcherbak 
 Shcherbakivskiy 
 Shcherban 
 Shcherbatyuk 
 Shchebatskiy 
 Shcherbachenko 
 Shcherbyna 
 Shchernulka 
 Shchyrytsya 
 Shchors 
 Shchuka 
 Shchurat 
 Shchurovskiy

Yu (Ю) 
 Yulyushek 
 Yurchenko 
 Yushchenko

Ya (Я) 
 Yavorsky 
 Yakimchuk 
 Yakovenko 
 Yanukovych 
 Yarema 
 Yaremchuk 
 Yarmolyuk

See also
 Ukrainian surnames

References

Ukraine